Viceversa is the fourth studio album by Italian singer-songwriter Francesco Gabbani. It was released on 14 February 2020 through BMG Rights Management. It was preceded by the singles "È un'altra cosa" and the title track "Viceversa", which was Gabbani's entry into the 70th edition of Italy's national Eurovision song selection competition, the Sanremo Music Festival 2020, where he placed second to Diodato's "Fai rumore".

Background and writing
Gabbani stated that the album was written about what interested him after the success of "Occidentali's Karma". The album was called a "nine-track journey" that "leaves the listener free to decipher the lyrics and question their balance within society". Gabbani wrote the title track "Viceversa" about his girlfriend, Giulia, but said the track was intended as a song about "universal love", or love regardless of gender.

On 5 June 2020, Gabbani released "Il sudore ci appiccica" as a single. The song was sent to radios across Italy for airplay on that date, and many of those stations commemorated the track's release date as "Gabbani day".

On 16 October 2020, Gabbani released a remix to "Einstein" as a single, titled "Einstein (E=mc2)". The song, which references the mass–energy equivalence in its title, is a slowed-down piano version of the original track found on "Viceversa".

Track listing

Charts

Weekly charts

Year-end charts

See also
List of 2020 albums

References

2020 albums
Francesco Gabbani albums
BMG Rights Management albums
Italian-language albums